Hugh Lee McKinnis, Jr. (born June 6, 1948) is a former professional American and Canadian football player who played in 3 CFL seasons from 1970 to 1972 for the Calgary Stampeders and 4 NFL seasons from 1973 to 1976 for the Cleveland Browns and the Seattle Seahawks.

References

1948 births
American football running backs
Arizona State Sun Devils football players
Canadian football running backs
Calgary Stampeders players
Cleveland Browns players
BC Lions players
Living people
People from Mercer County, Pennsylvania
Players of American football from Pennsylvania
Seattle Seahawks players